"Jiang Xingge Reencounters His Pearl Shirt" (蔣興哥重會珍珠衫), also translated as "The Pearl-sewn Shirt" or "The Pearl Shirt Reencountered", is a Chinese novella collected during the late Ming Dynasty. The history of the piece is somewhat contentious but it was most notably included in the collection Illustrious Words to Instruct the World, written by Feng Menglong, and published in 1620.

Genre

The piece has a few particular nuances that are worthy of note and distinction. First, the language in the piece is written vernacular, or baihua rather than literary language. This means that it was more accessible to the average person than pieces typically were. Second, while it is normally accepted by scholars that the piece was an adaptation of an oral story, there is evidence to support that the piece may in fact have been an adaptation of an earlier work, titled The Pearl Shirt as written by Sung Mao-Ch'eng Finally, the piece focuses on a mercantile lifestyle which was common for short stories at the time, but less common for Classical pieces like The Pearl Shirt.

The adaptation of the piece from The Pearl Shirt is notable for a few reasons. The translation from Classical language to baihua meant that many phrases were changed, and some of the distinctive language was lost. The structure between the pieces, though, has been primarily preserved, as well as most of the thematic content. There are roughly fifteen 'scenes' that the pair of stories share, and while much has changed the shift in perspective is most notable. The Pearl Shirt used a technique that Hanan referred to as "unobtrusive omniscience" whereas The Pearl-Sewn Shirt focused on "highly obtrusive omniscience." In layman's terms; the original piece had little outside context or interaction from the narrator, whereas the re-written one by Feng Meng-Long had a more expressive and invasive narrator or authorial tone.

Plot
Taking place in the early Ming dynasty, the story begins by following a merchant named Jiang Xingge, who had married a respectable wife, Wang Sanqiao. The pair were well-matched and Xingge did not travel away from home for two years, putting his business on hold. Eventually, he did have to go south, in order to conduct trade. Despite many restrictions and limitations on his wife, in order to preserve her chastity, Sanqiao is noticed by another merchant, named Chen Dalang. Chen cannot meet Sanqiao because she stays indoors, and is constantly surrounded by servants, as precaution by Xingge. Chen enlists the help of an older woman, also a merchant, named Madam Xue. She becomes friends with Sanqiao, as a part of the machinations by Chen. Eventually, Madam Xue is able to put the pair together and they start an affair. Sanqiao and Chen love each other, despite the fact that each is married.

The next year, Chen travels away as well. While he is departing, Sanqiao gives him a pearl-sewn shirt, which is an important family heirloom of the Jiang family. In his travels south, he meets Jiang Xingge. Chen confesses about his love affair but is ignorant to the fact that he is speaking to Sanqiao's husband. Chen shows Xingge the pearl shirt, and Xingge knows. Xingge then returns home, and sends his wife away with an order for a divorce. He also calls for thugs to smash up Madam Xue's home for her part of the misdeeds.

The story then changes perspective, to follow Chen Dalang's wife, Pingshi. The story continues as Pingshi and Chen argue over the pearl shirt, which Pingshi then hides, to spite him. Chen decides to go on a trip, but comes up ill. Pingshi leaves their home to find her husband, in order to take care of his illness, but instead, she finds that Chen has already died. She is advised by others to marry another man in order to pay for Chen's funeral and to take care of herself. The marriage is arranged to Xingge. The couple get along well, and when Jiang Xingge sees the pearl shirt that Pingshi kept, he believes that their pairing is divine intervention.

In the fourth, and final act, Xingge departs on a trip for business again, though this time, he gets into an argument in a market. Through a series of circumstances, this leads to the death of an old man, and Xingge is found to have charges pressed against him. The judge of the case is the new husband of his ex-wife, Sanqiao, and she begs her second husband to preserve Xingge's life. Xingge is spared, and when Sanqiao's husband is told the entire tale, the judge begins to cry and sees that Sanqiao and Xingge still care deeply for one another. He allows Sanqiao to leave him, and become Xingge's second wife. Rather than bicker or fight with one another, Pingshi and Sanqiao get along well, and the story draws to a close.

Possible Themes
Generally the piece focuses on the reinforcing of Confucian morals, primarily dealing with social contracts, such as marital obligations. As Wang is eventually overcome by her sexual desire, it can be said that there is also a treatise against excess. A major portion of the work also seems to focus on the intent of divine intervention. This comes in a few forms; when Jiang meets Chen, who has his family's heirloom shirt, or Pingshi and Jiang's marriage, as well as Wang's second husband being the judge of Jiang's trial.

Second, there is the introduction of a few Buddhist notions, most notably in the form of compassion. While Jiang does show anger towards Madam Xue, he only does what society dictates towards his wife and divorces her. This serves as an important part of the story, as later, his wife's favor saves his life when dealing with the judge. Even more, the judge is compassionate enough to understand the love between Wang and Jiang, and allows her to leave him, to return to her first husband.

Adaptation
A 2004 Chinese television film The Pearl Shirt (珍珠衫), directed by Teng Huatao, was based on the story. It starred Sunny Chan as Chen Dalang, Li Chen as Jiang Xingge, Choi On-kiu as Wang Sanqiao, and Cao Xiwen as the maid Qing'er.

References

Chinese short stories
Short stories by Feng Menglong